James Blake was the defending champion, but lost to Rubén Ramírez Hidalgo in the second round.

Nikolay Davydenko won the title, defeating Agustín Calleri 6–4, 6–3 in the final.

Seeds
All seeds receive a bye into the second round.

Draw

Finals

Top half

Section 1

Section 2

Bottom half

Section 3

Section 4

References

External links
 Main draw
 Qualifying draw

Pilot Pen Tennis
2006 Pilot Pen Tennis